Meseta Cosmelli Airport,  is an airstrip  northeast of  Puerto Guadal (es), a small town on the southwestern shore of General Carrera Lake in the Aysén Region of Chile.

The airstrip is on mesa overlooking the lake.

See also

Transport in Chile
List of airports in Chile

References

External links
OpenStreetMap - Meseta Cosmelli
OurAirports - Meseta Cosmelli
FallingRain - Meseta Cosmelli Airport

Airports in Chile
Airports in Aysén Region